Chehel Tanan (also Romanized as Chehel Tanān) is a village in Dehdez Rural District, Dehdez District, Izeh County, Khuzestan Province, Iran. At the 2006 census, its population was 66, in 15 families.

References 

Populated places in Izeh County